"Who'll Be the Next in Line" is a song by the English rock band the Kinks. It was written by Ray Davies.

Release
"Who'll Be the Next in Line" was first released as the B-side to "Ev'rybody's Gonna Be Happy", a Kinks single released in Britain. However, that song's chart performance in the UK was a disappointing #17, breaking a string of top-ten hits for the Kinks. Reprise felt that the "Ev'rybody's Gonna Be Happy" single was unfit for release in America. The subsequent single, "Set Me Free", was released, but after The Kinks' next proposed single, "See My Friends" was sent to Reprise, they decided to release the "Ev'rybody's Gonna Be Happy" single with "Who'll Be the Next in Line" as the A-side. The single charted, hitting #34, which was more successful than the following "See My Friends", which only hit #111. "Who'll Be the Next in Line" also appeared as a bonus track on some reissues of the Kinks' album Kinda Kinks.

Billboard described the song as a "pulsating funky blues rhythm number which rocks all the way."  Cash Box described it as a "fast-moving, rollicking thumper about a fella who has plenty of regrets about his romantic involvements."

Personnel 
According to band researcher Doug Hinman:

The Kinks
Ray Davieslead vocal, piano
Dave Davieselectric guitar
Pete Quaifebass guitar
Mick Avorydrums

References

Sources

 

1965 singles
The Kinks songs
British garage rock songs
Song recordings produced by Shel Talmy
Songs written by Ray Davies
Pye Records singles
1965 songs
Reprise Records singles